Lucianne Barroncas (born 1 April 1988) is a female water polo player of Brazil. She was part of the Brazilian team at the 2015 World Aquatics Championships. She also participated on the Brazilian Water Polo team at the 2016 Olympics.

See also
 Brazil at the 2015 World Aquatics Championships

References

Brazilian female water polo players
Living people
Place of birth missing (living people)
1988 births